Milena Victoria Warthon Tamariz (born 21 March 2000) is a Peruvian singer-songwriter. She is known for fusing pop and Andean music, creating the pop andino (Andean pop) genre. In 2023, she won the folclórico ("folk") category of the Viña del Mar International Song Festival with her song "Warmisitay".

Early life 
Warthon was born in Lima, Peru on 21 March 2000, to an Ancashina mother and Apurimeño father. She was raised in Lima and grew up listening to huayno music because her parents are from the countryside; she identifies as an Andean woman. She has cited her maternal grandmother, who was an amateur singer, as inspiration for her early career. At age eight, Warthon performed "What I've Been Looking For" from High School Musical at her school; she says she gained confidence in her abilities after this performance. At age 13, she began taking singing classes. At age 15, completed school and enrolled at the University of Lima to study music, but she later changed her course of study to communication.

Career 
After being inspired by one of her classmates, Warthon's parents helped connect her with a producer and vocal coach and she began posting covers. In February 2018, Warthon released her first cover: "Tú y yo" by Gian Marco. In June 2018, she performed reggae–huayno fusion songs on the music competition series Los Cuatro Finalistas.

In July 2020, Warthon started posting videos on TikTok, and by the end of the year, she had accrued about 100,000 followers. 

In February 2021, Warthon released a single, "Agua de Mar". The song reached #1 on Spotify's "Viral 50 - Peru" playlist. Also in 2021, she appeared on the music competition series La Voz Perú. On 28 July 2021, Warthon released "Mashup Peruano", a mashup of five Peruvian songs, in celebration of 200 years of Peruvian independence.

On 6 May 2022, Warthon released the single "Warmisitay", with a music video filmed in Yungay, Ancash. The song's title comes from a fusion of Quechua and Spanish and roughly translates to "(my) little young woman". She wrote the song as an homage to her grandmother. In February 2023, Warthon won the gaviota de plata ("silver seagull") at the Viña del Mar International Song Festival for her performance of "Warmisitay" in the folk competition.

Musical style 
Wharton's music is in the pop andino genre, a fusion of pop and Andean music. She coined the term. She has described her fusion music project as experimental in its early stages; she tried incorporating different genres into her music, including rock, reggae, reggaeton, criolla, and pop. 

Among her influences, she has cited North American pop, Spanish-language pop, cumbia, Peruvian music, and Andean music. She has cited Soledad Pastorutti as an influence in her fusion style, and said that she admires the work of Andean composer .

Further reading 
 Militza Martínez Meneses. (2022, December 16). "Sounds of contestation: urban young fans crossing boundaries through Pop Andino music." Social Policy for Development (SPD).

References 

Peruvian singer-songwriters
Folk singers
Pop singers

2000 births
Living people